The MENTAL or MLN64 NH2-terminal domain is a membrane-spanning domain that is conserved in two late endosomal proteins in vertebrates, MLN64 and MENTHO.  The domain is  170 amino acids long.

Current data indicates that this domain allows for dimerization between MLN64 and MENTHO molecules and with themselves.  The domain may also direct cholesterol transport.

References

Protein domains